"Hock The Kaiser!" is a World War I song written and composed by James H. Hall in 1917. It targets the German emperor Wilhelm II of Germany.
The work was self-published by James H. Hall in Chicago, Illinois. 

The sheet music can be found at the Pritzker Military Museum & Library and at the Library of Congress. The song begins, "Kaiser Bill, he had a dream that all the world he'd rule; Made a great big submarine with Uncle Sam to fool. Uncle Sam is riled enough to show'em where we stand, He will do some fighting, and will lick that German Band."

References

Bibliography
Parker, Bernard S. World War I Sheet Music 1. Jefferson: McFarland & Company, Inc., 2007. . 
Vogel, Frederick G. World War I Songs: A History and Dictionary of Popular American Patriotic Tunes, with Over 300 Complete Lyrics. Jefferson: McFarland & Company, Inc., 1995. . 

1917 songs
Songs of World War I
Songs about Wilhelm II